Website promotion is the continuing process used by webmasters to improve content and increase exposure of a website to bring more visitors. Many techniques such as search engine optimization and search engine submission are used to increase a site's traffic once content is developed.

With the rise in popularity of social media platforms, many webmasters have moved to platforms like Facebook, Twitter, LinkedIn and Instagram for viral marketing. By sharing interesting content, webmasters hope that some of the audience will visit the website. 
Examples of viral content are infographics and memes.

Webmasters often hire outsourced or offshore firms to perform website promotion for them, many of whom provide "low-quality, assembly-line link building". Link building

See also
Search engine marketing
Guerrilla marketing
Conversion rate optimization
Cross-device tracking

References

External links
Google's stance on various SEO practises
Bing SEO Analyzer

Promotion and marketing communications
Information technology management